Sambrial is a city in Sialkot District in the Punjab province of Pakistan. It is the capital of Sambrial Tehsil, an administrative subdivision of the district. Sialkot Dry Port is located in Sambrial. Sialkot international Airport is also located near Sambrial. It is the 90th largest city of Pakistan by population.

Location
The city is situated on the bank of Upper Chenab Canal and lies to the west of the district capital Sialkot. The tehsil of Sambrial is a tehsil of Sialkot District in Punjab, Pakistan comprising 160 villages which are politically organized under 17 union councils in 2017.

Sambrial motorway 
In mid 2022, the NHA started constructing the 69km Kharian-Sambrial motorway, expanding Lahore-Sialkot motorway (M-11). The estimated cost of the project was Rs42 billion, and work had begun at Kharian.

Officials stressed the need for quality roads and material, and for link roads to be built to connect cities. The government hopes to provide better travel facilities and reduce travel time. The first 35km phase has started from Kharian. Link roads to connect cities should also be built with quality materials. The government hopes to reduce travel time and provide better facilities.  

The National Highways Authority (NHA) earmarked 4,600 acres of land in three tehsils, and a sum of Rs13 billion allocated for compensation to the affected owners and utility services.

Photo gallery

References

External links
Sambrial official website

Cities and towns in Sialkot District